Jean Nuttli (born 2 January 1974 in Kriens) is a Swiss former cyclist.

Major results

2000
 1st Chrono des Herbiers
2001
 1st  National Time Trial Championships
 1st Stage 4 Tour du Poitou-Charentes
 1st Chrono des Herbiers
 1st Stage 4 Circuit de la Sarthe
 3rd GP Eddy Merckx
 3rd Grand Prix des Nations
2002
 1st Stage 4 Circuit de la Sarthe
 2nd National Time Trial Championships
2003
 1st Prologue Jadranska Magistrala
 1st Overall Brandenburg-Rundfahrt
1st Stage 1
 1st Duo Normand (with Philippe Schnyder)
 3rd National Time Trial Championships
2004
 3rd National Time Trial Championships

References

1974 births
Living people
Swiss male cyclists
People from Lucerne-Land District
Sportspeople from the canton of Lucerne